Pseudomonas azotoformans is a Gram-negative bacterium that infects cereal grains—especially rice. Based on 16S rRNA analysis, P. azotoformans has been placed in the P. fluorescens group.

References

External links
Type strain of Pseudomonas azotoformans at BacDive -  the Bacterial Diversity Metadatabase

Pseudomonadales
Bacteria described in 1963